Cobitis bilineata is a species of ray-finned fish in the family Cobitidae found in Croatia, Italy, Slovenia, and Switzerland. Its natural habitats are intermittent rivers and freshwater marshes. It is not considered threatened by the IUCN.

References

Cobitis
Fish described in 1865
Taxonomy articles created by Polbot
Endemic fauna of Bosnia and Herzegovina
Freshwater fish of Europe
Endemic fauna of the Balkans
Endemic fauna of Croatia
Endemic fauna of Italy